Chestnut Hill Cove is an unincorporated community in Anne Arundel County, Maryland, United States.

Designated as a "city" by the United States Postal Service, Chestnut Hill Cove is a waterfront community situated on 100 acres of land, in the Chesapeake Bay Watershed, containing 394 town homes. Located on Nabbs Creek in Chestnut Hill Cove Maryland, minutes from the Inner Harbor in Baltimore, the community offers a 30 slip marina, boat ramp facility, and a storage area. Development features in this community include extensive tree save areas and pioneering environmentally sensitive storm water management areas.

Geography
Chestnut Hill Cove is located at  (39.112809, -76.551871).

Chestnut Hill Cove is situated on 100 acres of land located on Fort Smallwood Road near the Chesapeake Bay. It is partially bordered by tidal inlets to the bay, notably Nabbs Creek to the east and south. It is bordered by Pasadena to the east, with the boundary in the vicinity of Solley Road, to the west. It is also bordered on the west by a 97 acre easement that is handled by the North County Land Trust which is located along Nabbs Creek.  Chestnut Cove Drive is the main route through the community, running generally north to south. Other streets include Chestnut Woods Court, Chestnut Haven Court, Arborwood Place, Veranda Court, Swanhill Court, Hollow Glen Court, Tillerman Place, Double Chestnut Court, Chestnut Moss Court, Chestnut Manor Court, Chestnut View Court, Chestnut Brook Court, Springhouse Lane, Timerfield Court, and Gardenview Court.

Notable natives and residents
 William Donald Schaefer - Mayor, Governor, and Comptroller

Schools and Education

Public Schools

 Northeast High School
 George Fox Middle School
 Solley Elementary School

Parochial Schools
 Saint Jane Frances

Private Schools
 Calvary Baptist Church Academy
 Magothy Cooperative Preschool
 St. Jane Frances De Chantel

Colleges
 Anne Arundel Community College

Sports Organizations

Baseball
 Lake Shore Youth Baseball
 Elvaton Park

Football
 Pasadena Chargers
 Rivera Beach Buccaneers
 Panthers Athletic Club

Soccer
 Mountain Road Soccer
 Pasadena Soccer Club
 Elvaton Park

Softball
 Green Haven Softball Assn.
 Havenwood Girls Softball
 Lake Shore Lightning Girls Softball

Basketball
 Riviera Beach Buccaneers
 Lake Shore Youth Basketball

Lacrosse
 Rivera Beach Buccaneers
 Youth Lacrosse Association

Swimming Pools
 North Arundel Aquatic Center
 Arundel Olympic Swim Center
 Big Vanilla
 Pleasure Cove Marina & Club

Libraries
 Mountain Road Public Library
 North County Public Library
 Rivera Beach Public Library

Churches
 Community United Methodist Church
 Emmanuel Lutheran Church
 Lake Shore Baptist Church
 Magothy United Methodist Church
 Solley United Methodist Church
 St. Jane Frances Church
 Pasadena United Methodist Church

References

External links
 Chestnut Hill Cove Home Owners Association
 Chestnut Hill Cove HOA Facebook Page
 Pasadena Business Association
 United States Postal Service
 Anne Arundel County

Unincorporated communities in Maryland
Unincorporated communities in Anne Arundel County, Maryland